The Autism Community in Action (TACA) (formerly known as Talk About Curing Autism)  is a nonprofit organization founded in 2000 by Lisa Ackerman and based in Irvine, California. The mission statement is "TACA provides education, support and hope to families living with autism."

TACA Programming includes Parent Education and Support through Chapter Meetings & Coffee Talks Education Events, Autism Journey Guides Website & Support Hotline Community Events Parent Mentoring National Conferences in California and Georgia Webinars and online parent education.

TACA is frequently at odds with the scientific consensus about autism's causes and treatments, with various spokespeople for the group having publicly indicated support for Andrew Wakefield, author of a fraudulent research paper linking vaccines and autism.

Group founder Lisa Ackerman used to attribute autism to a wide range of causes, urging parents to get rid of flame-retardant clothing or mattresses and new carpeting. She advocated for vitamin shots and hyperbaric oxygen chamber treatments.

Relationship with the anti-vaccine movement 
Among other critics, David Gorski identified TACA as "a group that promotes the idea that vaccines cause autism, as well as advocates dubious 'biomedical' treatments to 'cure' autism".

TACA was one of the sponsor groups of the Green our Vaccines march in Washington D.C on June 4, 2008, along with Generation Rescue. Actress and noted anti-vaccine activist Jenny McCarthy and then-boyfriend Jim Carrey were prominently featured at the rally, along with several speakers making specific links between vaccines and autism.

In 2010, when the medical journal The Lancet issued a full retraction of Andrew Wakefield's research paper linking vaccines and autism, Rebecca Estepp, speaking for TACA, insisted she still trusted Wakefield's research.

In 2015, the co-coordinator of TACA's Maryland chapter indicated that even though they question vaccines, her group was not a follower of McCarthy.

See also
Vaccine hesitancy
Autism Speaks

References

External links
 

Anti-vaccination organizations
Autism-related organizations in the United States
Charities based in California
Organizations established in 2000
Anti-vaccination in the United States
2000 establishments in the United States